The Canadian province of Nova Scotia has a historical system of 18 counties that originally had appointed court systems to administer local governance prior to the establishment of elected local governments in 1879. The historical counties continue as census divisions used by Statistics Canada for statistical purposes in administering the Canadian census.

History 
Prior to the establishment of rural municipalities in the form of county municipalities and district municipalities in 1879, local government within these historical counties was administered by appointed courts of sessions including justices appointed by the Crown with support from local proprietors selected to grand juries. These courts of sessions met "in the counties to hear cases, make regulations, authorize assessments, and appoint local officers." On April 17, 1879, the original non-elected courts of sessions were abolished in favour of elected councils when The County Incorporation Act came into force, which stated
 As a result, 12 county municipalities were established, while the remaining 6 counties, which were previously divided into districts for court sessional purposes, were established as district municipalities. Today, 9 of the original 12 remain incorporated as county municipalities, with 3 eventually becoming regional municipalities in 1995 and 1996, while Statistics Canada uses all 18 historical counties as census divisions for statistical purposes in the Canadian census. County municipalities and district municipalities provide local government to the residents of the historical counties living outside of incorporated towns and regional municipalities.

List

See also 

Administrative divisions of Canada
Demographics of Nova Scotia
Geography of Nova Scotia
List of communities in Nova Scotia
List of municipalities in Nova Scotia

List of towns in Nova Scotia
List of villages in Nova Scotia
Subdivisions of Canada

References

External links 
The County Incorporation Act and the Establishment of Municipal Government in Nova Scotia
Municipal History Highlights
Municipal Incorporation Timeline

 
Counties
Nova Scotia